Péter Bogáti (born 13 March 1991) is a Hungarian football player who plays for STC Salgótarján.

References

External links
Player profile at HLSZ 

1991 births
Living people
Footballers from Budapest
Hungarian footballers
Association football forwards
Association football midfielders
Diósgyőri VTK players
Kazincbarcikai SC footballers
BFC Siófok players
Budaörsi SC footballers
Monori SE players
Nemzeti Bajnokság I players
Nemzeti Bajnokság II players